The Wendenhorn is a mountain of the Urner Alps, located on the border between the Swiss cantons of Bern and Uri. It is located approximately halfway between the Titlis and the Susten Pass.

References

External links
 Wendenhorn on Hikr

Mountains of the Alps
Alpine three-thousanders
Mountains of Switzerland
Mountains of the canton of Uri
Mountains of the canton of Bern
Bern–Uri border